Browns Run is a  long 2nd order tributary to Peters Run in Ohio County, West Virginia.

Variant names 
According to the Geographic Names Information System, it has also been known historically as:
 Brown's Run

Course 
Browns Run rises in a pond about 2.5 miles northeast of Wheeling, West Virginia, in Ohio County and then flows southeast to Peters Run at Eden.

Watershed 
Browns Run drains  of area, receives about 41.0 in/year of precipitation, has a wetness index of 275.95, and is about 58% forested.

See also 
 List of rivers of West Virginia

References 

Rivers of Ohio County, West Virginia
Rivers of West Virginia